General Sir Martin Baker Farndale,  (6 January 1929 – 10 May 2000) was a British Army officer who reached high office in the 1980s.

Military career
Educated at Yorebridge Grammar School, Askrigg, and the Royal Military Academy Sandhurst, Farndale was commissioned into the Royal Artillery in 1948. He went to the Staff College, Camberley in 1959.

In 1969 Farndale was appointed Commanding Officer of 1st Regiment Royal Horse Artillery, which was deployed to Northern Ireland at the early stages of The Troubles. In 1973 he was appointed commander of the 7th Armoured Brigade in Germany before, in 1978, he returned to the UK to become Director of Operations at the Ministry of Defence in which role he had to organise the disarming of guerillas in order to facilitate the creation of the future nation of Zimbabwe. He was appointed General Officer Commanding (GOC) 2nd Armoured Division in Germany in 1980.

In 1983, Farndale became GOC of 1st British Corps. In 1985, he was made GOC of British Army of the Rhine and Northern Army Group. He was also Colonel Commandant of the Army Air Corps from 1980 to 1987.

Following his retirement at the end of December 1987, Farndale was a defence adviser to Short Brothers plc and to Deloitte Touche and wrote four volumes of the History of the Royal Artillery.

Family
In 1955 Farndale married Margaret Anne Buckingham. They had one son.

References

|-
 

|-

|-

1929 births
2000 deaths
Graduates of the Royal Military Academy Sandhurst
British Army generals
Royal Horse Artillery officers
Knights Commander of the Order of the Bath
Royal Artillery officers
Graduates of the Staff College, Camberley